Benzothiazine is a heterocyclic compound consisting of a benzene ring attached to the  6-membered heterocycle thiazine. The name is applied to both the 2H- and 4H-isomers of the molecule.

2,1-Benzothiazine, a type of benzothiazines was first reported in the 1960s. Subsequently, their preparation and intensive biological and physiological studies have been reported. In recent years, 2,1-benzothiazines have been of enormous interest to synthetic chemists. An enantioselective synthesis of such benzothiazines has been developed by Harmata and Hong who have formulated transformations of these compounds designed to target chiral, non-racemic building blocks as well as natural products.

See also 
 Phenothiazine has an additional benzene ring
 Benzothiazole is another heterocycle containing nitrogen and sulfur

References
1. Sulfostyril (2,1-benzothiazine 2,2-dioxide). I. Preparation and reactions of 3,4-dihydrosulfostyril. Loev,B.; Kormendy, M.F. J. Org. Chem. 1965, 30, 3163.

2. Recent Progress in the Chemistry of 2,1-Benzothiazines. Hong, X.; Harmata, M. Progress in Heterocyclic Chemistry, Chapter 1, G. W. Gribble and J. A. Joule, eds, Pergamon Press, Vol 19, pp 1-43 (2008)

3. The Intramolecular, Stereoselective Addition of Sulfoximine Carbanions to α, β-Unsaturated Esters. Harmata, M.; Hong, X. Journal of the American Chemical Society, 2003, 125(19), 5754-5756.

4. Benzothiazines in Synthesis. A Total Synthesis of Pseudopteroxazole. Harmata, M.; Hong, X. Organic Letters, 2005, 7(16), 3581-3583.

Benzothiazines